An infrared dark cloud (IRDC) is a cold, dense region of a giant molecular cloud. They can be seen in silhouette against the bright diffuse mid-infrared emission from the galactic plane.

Discovery
Infrared dark clouds have only been recently discovered in 1996 using the ISO and therefore are in need of further research.

Importance
Astronomers believe that they represent the earliest stage in the formation of high-mass stars
 and are therefore of great importance for understanding the star formation process as a whole.

Statistics and Mass

See also 
Galactic plane
Intergalactic star
Star Formation

References

Star formation